Siroko is a settlement in the Xanthi regional unit of Greece located south of Sminthi. In 1991, the population of the settlement was around 108 inhabitants. In 2001, the number of inhabitants living in Siroko rose to around 111.

External links

Populated places in Xanthi (regional unit)